The women's 50 metre rifle three positions event at the 2020 Summer Olympics took  place on 31 July 2021 at the Asaka Shooting Range.

Records 
Prior to this competition, the existing world and Olympic records were as follows.

Schedule 
All times are Japan Standard Time (UTC+9)

Results

Qualification

Final

References 

Shooting at the 2020 Summer Olympics
Women's events at the 2020 Summer Olympics
Women's 050m 3 positions 2020
2021 in women's shooting sports